Arichanna transfasciata is a moth of the  family Geometridae. It is found in Laos, Myanmar, Bhutan and India.

References

Moths described in 1893
Boarmiini
Moths of Asia